Victoria Nasya Marcella Tedja, also known as Nasya Marcella (born 9 December 1996) is an actress in  Indonesian soap operas. She is known for starring in Satria as Tiara and on Yang Masih Dibawah Umur as Tiara. She is also known for starring Akibat Pernikahan Dini as Dini

Television 
{| class="wikitable"
|-
! Year
! Title
! Channel
! Production
! Role
|-
| 2011
| Safira
| Indosiar
| Multivision
| Safira
|-
| 2012
| Yang Masih Dibawah Umur
| RCTI
| SinemArt
| Tiara
|-
| 2013
| Magic
| RCTI
| SinemArt
| Nadine
|-
| 2013-2014
| Fortune Cookies
| RCTI
| SinemArt
| Jasmin
|-
| 2014-2015
| Jakarta Love Story
| RCTI
| SinemArt
| Dira
|-
| 2016
| 7 Manusia Harimau New Generation
| MNC TV
| SinemArt
| Sekar Kemuning (Kay)
|-
| 2017-2019
| Anak Langit
| SCTV
| SinemArt
| Milka Ayu Kinasih/Maira|-
|2021
|Suci dalam Cinta
| SCTV
| Screenplay Productions
| Sheila|-
|2022
|Aku Bukan Wanita Pilihan
| RCTI
| MNC Pictures
| Tiara Fitri Anjani'''
|}

 Movies 
 Abdullah V Takeshi (2016) as Indah
 Demi Cinta'' (2016) as Sandra

External links 
 

21st-century Indonesian actresses
Living people
1996 births